The Thomas P. Arnold House is a historic house in Palmetto, Georgia, United States. Built in 1906, the property was listed on the National Register of Historic Places in 1984.

History 
The building was constructed in 1906 in the city of Palmetto, Georgia. The house served as the residence for the mayor of Palmetto, Thomas P. Arnold, and after his death, the residence of his son, Thomas P. Arnold, Jr., who also served as mayor of Palmetto. The architectural style of the house incorporates elements of the American Craftsman and Classical Revival styles. The house was designed by the Atlanta-based architectural firm of Butt & Morris. The building was added to the National Register of Historic Places on May 10, 1984.

See also 
 National Register of Historic Places listings in Fulton County, Georgia

References 

1906 establishments in Georgia (U.S. state)
Houses completed in 1906
Houses in Fulton County, Georgia
Houses on the National Register of Historic Places in Georgia (U.S. state)
National Register of Historic Places in Fulton County, Georgia